Casa Vallejo is a historic hotel in Baguio, Philippines. Built in 1909, it is the oldest hotel in the city. It is also recognized as Baguio Centennial Commission as one of the 10 oldest institutions in the city. The hotel is located along Upper Session Road.

History
Casa Vallejo prior to the 1920s, served as residence of Bureau of Public Works employees and was referred to as Dormitory 4. In 1917, the building was used as a German Prisoner of War detention center. The structure was built using of wood, galvanized iron, and sawali.

In 1923, the dormitory became a hotel. In 1927, Salvador Vallejo leased the hotel from the government. The building also served as a British and Indian refugee center in 1940. Casa Vallejo survived the carpet bombing by Imperial Japan in 1941 during World War II.

The Mountain Province High School (now the Baguio City National High School) used to be a tenant of the Casa Vallejo building prior to moving in Andebok in the 1950s.

Casa Vallejo was recognized as a historic site, with the National Historical Commission of the Philippines unveiling a marker for the recognition on September 20, 2019.

References

External links
 

Hotels established in 1923
Hotel buildings completed in 1909
Hotels in the Philippines
Buildings and structures in Baguio
1923 establishments in the Philippines